The men's pole vault at the 2012 World Junior Championships in Athletics was held at the Estadi Olímpic Lluís Companys on 10 and 12 July.

Medalists

Records
, the existing world junior and championship records were as follows.

Results

Qualification

Qualification: Standard 5.20 m (Q) or at least best 12 qualified (q)

Final

Participation
According to an unofficial count, 31 athletes from 24 countries participated in the event.

References

External links
WJC12 pole vault schedule

Pole Vault
Pole vault at the World Athletics U20 Championships